Hubert Velud (born 8 June 1959) is a French former Association football player and most recently manager of the Sudan national team, following his departure from JS Kabylie mid season 2019–20.

Playing career
Velud was born in Villefranche-sur-Saône. A goalkeeper, played for Stade de Reims, Châlons-sur-Marne.

Coaching career
Velud coached Châlons-sur-Marne, Gap, Paris FC, Gazélec Ajaccio, Clermont, Cherbourg, Créteil, Toulon, Beauvais. He also managed the Togo national football team from 2009 to 2010. He trained TP Mazembe.

2010 African Cup of Nations shooting
Velud was shot in the arm in an attack by Angolan rebels while traveling with Togo's national football team to the 2010 African Cup of Nations.

Honours
Clermont
 Championnat National: 2001–02

ES Sétif
 Ligue 1: 2013

USM Alger
 Algerian Super Cup: 2013
 Ligue 1: 2014

TP Mazembe
 CAF African Cup: 2016
 CAF Super Cup: 2016
 Congolese Ligue 1: 2016
 Congolese Super Cup: 2016

References

External links

1959 births
Living people
Sportspeople from Villefranche-sur-Saône
Association football goalkeepers
French footballers
Stade de Reims players
Ligue 2 players
French football managers
Paris FC managers
Gazélec Ajaccio managers
Clermont Foot managers
AS Cherbourg Football managers
US Créteil-Lusitanos managers
SC Toulon managers
AS Beauvais Oise managers
2010 Africa Cup of Nations managers
Togo national football team managers
Shooting survivors
Survivors of terrorist attacks
Hassania Agadir managers
ES Sétif managers
USM Alger managers
CS Constantine managers
TP Mazembe managers
Étoile Sportive du Sahel managers
Difaâ Hassani El Jadidi managers
JS Kabylie managers
Sudan national football team managers
French expatriate football managers
Expatriate football managers in Morocco
French expatriate sportspeople in Morocco
Expatriate football managers in Algeria
French expatriate sportspeople in Algeria
Expatriate football managers in the Democratic Republic of the Congo
French expatriate sportspeople in the Democratic Republic of the Congo
Expatriate football managers in Tunisia
French expatriate sportspeople in Tunisia
Algerian Ligue Professionnelle 1 managers
Linafoot managers
Tunisian Ligue Professionnelle 1 managers
Footballers from Auvergne-Rhône-Alpes